Nahshon Aaron Garrett (born August 21, 1993) is an American freestyle and graduated folkstyle wrestler, who currently competes at 57 kilograms. In the international style, Garrett was originally the U.S. representative for the 2018 World Championships at 61 kg as the Final X champion before withdrawing from the tournament, and is also a two-time US Open runner-up and Dave Schultz Memorial International runner-up. As a folkstyle wrestler, he was the '16 NCAA Division I National champion (runner-up in 2014), a four-time NCAA All-American and a four-time EIWA Conference champion for the Cornell Big Red.

Early life

Nahshon Garrett was born in Chico, California, the son of Golden Sizemore and Alvin Garrett, and grew up with two brothers and four sisters. He attended Chico High School
and graduated from Cornell University with a degree in developmental sociology in 2016. Garrett started wrestling at the age of 13.

Wrestling career

Wrestling on the Cornell team, Garrett won the 133 pound NCAA Division I National Championship in 2016. He finished the 2015–2016 season with a perfect 37-0, and was the 2016 EIWA Wrestler of the Year.  A four-time All American for Cornell University, his collegiate career record was 149-12, and he was selected for membership in the Quill and Dagger society.

Garrett competed at the 2016 Freestyle Wrestling Olympic Trials, losing a controversial match to Tony Ramos. In the match Garrett was leading 3-2 when he was hit with a stalling penalty point just seconds before the end of the match, giving Ramos the victory by decision.

After graduating from Cornell University, Nahshon moved to Arizona State University to train with Sunkist Kids and pursue an international wrestling career. In 2019 he moved to Tennessee to train for the 2020 Summer Olympics.

External links
 Nahshon Garrett's Rokfin Channel
Jesse Delgado vs. Nahshon Garrett: 2014 NCAA title match

References

Cornell Big Red wrestlers
Living people
1993 births
People from Chico, California
Cornell University alumni
Sportspeople from Chico, California